Pichitphong Choeichiu (born August 28, 1982) is a Thai retired professional footballer who plays as a midfielder currently head coach for Thai League 3 club Muang Loei United.

Club career
He previously spent his youth career with Suphanburi Sports College between 1997 and 1999 before moving to Krung Thai Bank /Bangkok Glass in 1999. The midfielder was promoted to the first team in 2002, and the club won two consecutive titles, in 2002–2003 and 2003–2004. Krung Thai Bank /Bangkok Glass also took part in the AFC Champions League three times between 2003 and 2008 but never progressed further than the group stage. After the championships in 2003 and 2004 the club finished empty-handed for the next four seasons, through 2008, which was Pichitphong's last season with Krung Thai Bank. He made 116 appearances and scored 39 goals for the club. In 2008, Phichitphong moved to former Thai Division 1 League champions Muangthong United. He won the Thai Premier League title twice with the Twin Qilins, in 2009 and 2010, and also won more silverware.

In December 2021, Pichitphong announcing his retirement from football at the age of 39, being played in the last game in the match with Chiangmai on the night of 8 December 2021.

International goals

Honours

Club
Krung Thai Bank 
 Thai Premier League: 2002-03, 2003-04
 Kor Royal Cup: 2003, 2004

Muangthong United
 Thai Premier League: 2009, 2010, 2012
 Kor Royal Cup: 2010

International
Thailand U-23
 Sea Games Gold Medal: 2001, 2003, 2005

Thailand
 T&T Cup: 2008

External links

References

1982 births
Living people
Pichitphong Choeichiu
Pichitphong Choeichiu
Association football midfielders
Pichitphong Choeichiu
Pichitphong Choeichiu
Pichitphong Choeichiu
Pichitphong Choeichiu
Pichitphong Choeichiu
Pichitphong Choeichiu
Pichitphong Choeichiu
Pichitphong Choeichiu
Pichitphong Choeichiu
2004 AFC Asian Cup players
2007 AFC Asian Cup players
Pichitphong Choeichiu
Southeast Asian Games medalists in football
Competitors at the 2001 Southeast Asian Games
Competitors at the 2003 Southeast Asian Games
Competitors at the 2005 Southeast Asian Games